Alawi means "follower of Ali" or "descendant of Ali", and is a common surname (and sometimes as a given name) in the Muslim world. In Arab countries occupied by the British Empire, the name is transliterated as "Alawi". In Arab countries that were occupied by the French Third Republic, the name is transliterated as "Alaoui". In South Asia it is usually transliterated as "Alavi" or "Alvi" (see Alavi).

Alawi
 Ahmad al-Alawi
 Alawi bin Husain
 Abdallah bin Alawi
 Majeed Al Alawi
 Alawi Shukri
 Abdulaziz Fayez Al Alawi
 Badar Juma Subait Al Alawi
 Moath Hamza Ahmed al Alwi
 Muhammad Alawi al-Maliki
 Ivana Alawi
 Alawi Mohammed Alsakkaf

Allawi
Allawi is a family name mostly prevalent in Iraq. Notable people with the surname include:

 Ayad Allawi (born 1945), former Prime Minister of the Iraqi Interim Government
 Mohammed Tawfiq Allawi, former Iraqi Minister of Communications and Member of the Council of Representatives
 Ali Allawi, former Iraqi Defence and Finance minister

Alaoui
 Mariem Alaoui Selsouli
 Zakaria Alaoui
 Suleiman al-Alaoui

See also
Alavi (surname)

Arabic-language surnames